Gora is a surname. Notable people with the surname include:

Claudio Gora (1913–1998), Italian actor and director
Jo Ann M. Gora, American president of Ball State University
Pyotr Gora  (1922-2002) Hero of the Soviet Union
Ronald Gora (1933–2014), American swimmer
Tahir Aslam Gora, Pakistani-Canadian, author, activist. Founder of TAG TV and host of the show Bilatakalluf.